Nicola Salmoria is an Italian software developer. He is the original developer of MAME, an emulator application designed to recreate the hardware of arcade machines in software. In December 2002, he graduated from the University of Siena with a laurea in mathematics, with a thesis written about MAME.

Before his fame as the author of MAME, he was active in the Amiga software development scene, producing utility programs such as NewIcons.

He has defeated numerous encryption algorithms, including the CPS-2 program ROM encryption (together with Andreas Naive), the Kabuki (sound) program ROM encryption and the graphics ROM encryption in the later Neo Geo games. He is also a founding member of the JP1 remote project.

He became less and less involved with MAME development over the years, and his last contributions date back to 2009.

In 2013, Salmoria started writing reviews of puzzle games on his own blog.

Since 2012, he has been developing puzzle games for iOS devices.

References

External links
 Salmoria's blog about MAME
 Salmoria's blog about logic puzzles

Italian computer programmers
Living people
Year of birth missing (living people)
University of Siena alumni